Qasab-e Zalkan (also Romanized as Qaşāb-e Z̄ālkān) is a village in Esbu Kola Rural District, in the Central District of Babol County, Mazandaran Province, Iran. At the 2006 census, its population was 432, in 120 families.

References 

Populated places in Babol County